Gwendolyn Yates Whittle (born 1961) is a three-time Academy Award-nominated sound editor. She has worked on over 120 films to date. She has won 5 Golden Reel Awards at the Motion Picture Sound Editors. She is a member of Skywalker Sound.

Oscar nominations
Two nominations are in the category of Best Sound Editing and one is in the category of Best Sound.

82nd Academy Awards-Nominated for Avatar. Nomination shared with Christopher Boyes. Lost to The Hurt Locker.
83rd Academy Awards-Nominated for Tron: Legacy. Nomination shared with Addison Teague. Lost to Inception.
95th Academy Awards-Nominated for Avatar: The Way of Water. Nomination shared with Julian Howarth, Dick Bernstein, Christopher Boyes, Gary Summers, and Michael Hedges.

References

External links

1961 births
Sound editors
Living people
Women sound editors